Reichenau is a municipality in the district of Feldkirchen in the Austrian state of Carinthia.

Geography

The municipal area is situated in the upper valley of the Gurk River within the Nock Mountains range (part of the Gurktal Alps). In the north, the road from Feldkirchen leads up to Turracher Höhe Pass and Turracher See at a height of  AA on the border with Predlitz-Turrach in Styria and further down into the Mur Valley. Reichenau is the eastern terminus of the Nockalmstraße scenic route through the Nock Mountains to Krems.

Reichenau consists of the cadastral communities Ebene Reichenau, Sankt Lorenzen, Sankt Margarethen, Wiedweg, and Winkl.

Neighboring municipalities

History

The remote and densely forested area of the upper Gurk Valley was settled by Celtic colonists when the region was part of the Noricum kingdom, which in 15 BC was incorporated as a province of the Roman Empire. From about 590 Alpine Slavs immigrated into the lower parts of the valley, followed by Bavarian settlers in the 10th century.

In the High Middle Ages, when the area was part of the Duchy of Carinthia, the valley belonged to the estates of Millstatt Abbey. From about 1300 the Benedictine monks had large parts of the woodland cleared.

A Protestant prayer house (Toleranzbethaus) in Wiedweg was first mentioned in 1787. About 16% of the local population confess to the Protestant Church.

Politics
Seats in the municipal assembly (Gemeinderat) as of 2009 elections:
Freedom Party of Austria (FPÖ): 9
Social Democratic Party of Austria (SPÖ): 7
Austrian People's Party (ÖVP): 3

Twin towns — sister cities

Reichenau is twinned with:
 Nersingen, Germany, since 2009

Notable people
Siegfried Grabner (born 1975), snowboarder

References

Gallery

External links
  Municipal site

Cities and towns in Feldkirchen District